Ruthford Eduardo "Chico" Salmon (December 3, 1940 – September 17, 2000) was a Panamanian professional baseball player. He played in Major League Baseball as a utility player from  through , most notably as a member of the Baltimore Orioles team that won three consecutive American League pennants from 1969 to 1971 and, won the World Series in 1970. He also played for the Cleveland Indians.

Salmon graduated from Abel Bravo High School in Colon, Panama where he lettered in baseball, basketball, and track. He later attended Abel Bravo College, where he also played baseball. It was as a college student that Salmon played for the Panamanian baseball team during the 1959 Pan-American Games in Venezuela. Shortly after playing in that tournament, Chico was signed by the Pacific Coast League's Denver club of the Milwaukee Braves organization.

Salmon was selected by the Seattle Pilots in the expansion draft following the 1968 season, but was acquired by the Orioles for Gene Brabender and Gordon Lund on March 31, 1969.

Salmon was not particularly well-known for his fielding. While he was still with the team, the Orioles had a mock award named the Chico Salmon No Touch Award "to recognize fielding prowess that had all the deftness of a rhinoceros knitting," according to Jim Palmer. He was, however, widely known for his belief in ghosts which caused him to always sleep with the lights on.

He died from a heart attack on September 17, 2000 at the age of 59.

References

Sources

1940 births
2000 deaths
Baltimore Orioles players
Cleveland Indians players
Denver Bears players
Durham Bulls players
Knoxville Smokies players
Major League Baseball first basemen
Major League Baseball players from Panama
Major League Baseball second basemen
Major League Baseball shortstops
Missoula Timberjacks players
Panamanian expatriate baseball players in the United States
Sportspeople from Colón, Panama
Pocatello Giants players
Portland Beavers players